Mahesh Bhupathi and Leander Paes were the defending champions but they competed with different partners that year, Bhupathi with Max Mirnyi and Paes with Michael Hill.

Hill and Paes lost in the first round to Ivan Ljubičić and Andrei Pavel.

Bhupathi and Mirnyi lost in the final 7–5, 6–3 against James Blake and Todd Martin.

Seeds

Draw

Final

Top half

Bottom half

External links
 2002 Western & Southern Financial Group Masters Doubles Draw

2002 Western & Southern Financial Group Masters
Doubles